Cuchumuela Municipality or Villa Gualberto Villarroel Municipality is the fifth municipal section of the Punata Province in the Cochabamba Department, Bolivia. Its seat is Cuchumuela.

Cantons 

The municipality consists of only one canton, Cuchumuela Canton. It is identical to the municipality.

See also 
 Atuq Wachana
 Wila Jaqhi

References 

 Instituto Nacional de Estadistica de Bolivia

Municipalities of the Cochabamba Department